Mario Martiradonna (28 August 1938 – 20 November 2011) was an Italian footballer who played as a defender.

Career
Martiradonna was born in Bari, Italy, but grew up in Melfi. A right-back, he played for Teramo and Reggiana before joining Cagliari in 1962. He became a stalwart of the side, winning promotion to the top division in 1964, and the Serie A championship in 1970.

References

External links
Profile at Enciclopediadelcalcio.it

1938 births
2011 deaths
People from Melfi
Italian footballers
S.S. Teramo Calcio players
A.C. Reggiana 1919 players
Cagliari Calcio players
Sportspeople from the Province of Potenza
Association football defenders
Footballers from Basilicata
Footballers from Bari